The Brown University Computing Laboratory is an academic building of Brown University located at 180 George Street in Providence, Rhode Island. It was built in 1961 and designed by noted architect Philip Johnson. The building was funded through a donation by the family of Thomas J. Watson, Sr. and dedicated to his memory. It was designed to house the IBM 7070 which was obtained through grants from the National Science Foundation and the IBM Corporation. On a wall in the main lobby hung a tapestry given by Philip Johnson after a design by Arshile Gorky.

According to the Encyclopedia Brunoniana, Philip Johnson wrote, “I conceived the Brown Computing Laboratory as a porticus – a porch – to emphasize its importance as a technical center, its unique setting in the cityscape and its dignity as a memorial building. Though neo-Classical, therefore in conception, the materials and the design of the columns are quite contemporary. Only precast stone could have been used to form the X’s of the entablature; only plate glass could render the porch usable in New England. By use of the red granite chips, I thought to harmonize the Laboratory with the 19th century which surrounds it.” 

The machine room, a classroom, and meeting rooms were on the first floor and staff offices and storage rooms were in the basement. Also on the first floor was a dedicated space for a virtual reality environment known as the YURT.

In 1988, the Applied Mathematics Division became the primary occupant after a new Center for Information Technology building was opened. Subsequently, the Center for Computation and Visualization became the primary occupant.

References 

Philip Johnson buildings
Brown University
Brown University buildings